Shibahara (written:  or ) is a Japanese surname. Notable people with the surname include:

, Japanese voice actress
, Japanese-American tennis player
, Japanese baseball player
, Japanese footballer
, Japanese diver

See also
Shibahara Station, a monorail station in Toyonaka, Osaka Prefecture, Japan

Japanese-language surnames